Peni is a sub-prefecture in Mandoul Occidental department or prefecture of Mandoul Region of Chad.

References 

Populated places in Chad